The Stjørnfjord or Stjørnfjorden is an arm of Trondheimsfjorden that flows through the municipalities of Ørland and Indre Fosen in Trøndelag county, Norway. The inner part of the fjord splits into two smaller arms, the Nordfjord and Sørfjord.

The village of Austrått, which includes the Austrått manor, is located on the northern shore near the outlet of the Stjørnfjorden into the Trondheimsfjord. A little further into the fjord lies the village of Stjørna, after which the fjord is named. The village of Høybakken and Heggvik Church lie on the north side of the fjord. On the south side is Fevåg on the far side of Bakstein point. Skerries stick up where the fjord parts into two arms. The village of Råkvåg is located on the south side of the Nordfjord, while the village of Mælan is located at the terminus of the Sørfjord.

Norwegian County Road 718 goes along the south shore of the fjord, while Norwegian County Road 231 goes along a portion of the north shore.

References

External links

Fjords of Trøndelag
Ørland
Indre Fosen